Keith Paul Narkle (born 20 November 1952) is a former Australian rules football player of indigenous background who played for the Swan Districts Football Club in the West Australian Football League (WAFL) during the 1970s and 1980s. Keith played in the 1982–83–84 premiership sides for Swans, captaining them to the 1983 and 1984 premierships.

Keith is the older brother of Phil Narkle who also played for Swan Districts Football Club. Keith was a superb footballer with pace to burn and silky skills. He was an ideal wingman and also played on the half forward flank. Keith Narkle was selected on a wing in the Swan Districts Team of the Century.

References

External links
Keith Narkle player profile page at WAFLFootyFacts

Australian rules footballers from Western Australia
Swan Districts Football Club players
Indigenous Australians from Western Australia
Indigenous Australian players of Australian rules football
People from Bunbury, Western Australia
1952 births
Living people
West Australian Football Hall of Fame inductees